Helcystogramma immeritellum is a moth in the family Gelechiidae. It was described by Francis Walker in 1864. It is known from Java in Indonesia and from Sri Lanka.

Adults are fawn coloured, the forewings with five whitish oblique elongated costal spots, the first before the middle, the second beyond and the rest near the tip. The hindwings are paler.

References

Moths described in 1864
immeritellum
Moths of Asia